The Soho Square Ladies Tournament was a tournament for professional female tennis players played on outdoor hardcourts. The event was classified as a $100,000 ITF Women's Circuit tournament and was held in Sharm El Sheikh, Egypt. In 2013, the event was classified as a $75,000+H event and held on clay courts.

Past finals

Singles

Doubles

External links
 ITF search

ITF Women's World Tennis Tour
Hard court tennis tournaments
Clay court tennis tournaments
Tennis tournaments in Egypt
Recurring sporting events established in 2013
Recurring sporting events disestablished in 2016
Defunct sports competitions in Egypt